WKXZ (93.9 FM) is a radio station broadcasting a hot adult contemporary format. Licensed to Norwich, New York, United States, the station is owned by Townsquare Media.

History
The station went on the air as a class A FM station with the call letters WCHN-FM in 1961. It was initially transmitting from the WCHN-AM tower. In 1983, the station was upgraded to a class B FM station and changed its call sign to the current WKXZ. It moved to a new transmitter site at the former ATT microwave tower on Tanner Hill, off of NY State Highway 23.  Concurrent with the move, the station increased power from 3,000 watts ERP to 26,000 Watts ERP.

Translators

References

External links

KXZ
Townsquare Media radio stations
Radio stations established in 1961
1961 establishments in New York (state)
Hot adult contemporary radio stations in the United States